Mr. Red is the first mascot of the Cincinnati Reds baseball team.  He is a humanoid figure dressed in a Reds uniform, with an oversized baseball for a head. Sometimes, Mr. Red is referred to by the team as "The Running Man" for the way he has posed on the logo c. 1968.

Mr. Red was created by Henry "Hank" Zureick, the Reds Publicity Director. The character first appeared on the cover of the 1953 Cincinnati Red Stockings yearbook, which was also produced by Mr. Zureick, along with many yearbooks and programs during his career.

Mr. Red made his first appearance on a Reds uniform as a sleeve patch in 1955. The patch featured Mr. Red's head, clad in an old-fashioned white pillbox baseball cap with red stripes. The following season, 1956, saw the Reds adopt sleeveless jerseys, and Mr. Red was eliminated from the home uniform. He was moved to the left breast of the road uniform, and remained there for one season before being eliminated entirely.

In 1999, the Reds re-designed their uniform and "Mr. Red" was reintroduced as a sleeve patch on the undershirt.

A human version of the mascot had appeared in 1972 and went full time in 1973 season. By the end of 1973 Tom Kindig replaced his older brother Chuck as the day to day Mr. Red mascot for remainder of the 1970s. Many viewed Mr. Red nationally in Game 5 of 1975 World Series, when he appeared on screen during the NBC broadcast (see the DVD version available on A&E Video). The mascot disappeared in the late 1980s for unknown reasons. The costumed mascot was reintroduced in 1997.

Mr. Red was joined by Gapper, a new furry mascot created by David Raymond (the original Phillie Phanatic), as the franchise moved to Great American Ballpark in 2003. In 2007, the current Mr. Red has been supplemented by a retro 1950s version known as "Mr. Redlegs", complete with handlebar mustache and old fashioned baseball uniform. Throughout the 1970s and 1980s, Mr. Red wore uniform number 27.

The humanoid Mr. Red retired in 2007 leaving "Gapper" and a mascoted "Mr. Redlegs" to take his place. In August 2008, a female companion named "Rosie Red" named in honor of the group that supports the team, the Rosie Reds, was introduced. A new Mr. Red Mascot was unveiled at Redsfest for the 2012 season, the mascot is now on the field with "Gapper" and "Rosie Red" and "Mr. Redlegs."

References

External links

Major League Baseball team mascots
Cincinnati Reds